Mirjam Weichselbraun (born 27 September 1981) is an Austrian television host and actress, best known in Austria for presenting Dancing Stars, Life Ball and the Vienna Opera Ball. She is best known, outside Austria and Germany, for co-presenting the Eurovision Song Contest in 2015.

Career
In January 2002, she joined the newly started music channel VIVA PLUS in Cologne, where she hosted the show Cologne Day. After only eight months she switched to MTV Germany in Berlin where she hosted the live show MTV Select until January 2005. In Germany, she has interviewed some of the most famous artists in the music business including Jon Bon Jovi and Nickelback. She presented TRL Germany with Joko Winterscheidt (alternating with Patrice Bouédibéla and Karolin Oesterling) until April 2007.

Since 2003, next to her job on MTV, she has also been hosting the ZDF online-magazine for the game show Wetten, dass..?. In 2004 she has, together with Christian Clerici, hosted the live show Expedition Österreich (Expedition Austria), and one year later the Austrian preliminaries for the Eurovision Song Contest 2005, as well as the dancing show Dancing Stars with Alfons Haider on ORF. Her hosting of Dancing Stars earned her the Austrian Romy television award in 2006 and 2008. In 2006, Weichselbraun and Wayne Carpendale presented the German version of Dancing on Ice on RTL, which made her very popular in Germany. Other hosting jobs include the Life Ball, Kiddy Contest, The Dome and the Romy awards presentation in 2008 and 2013.

In addition to her job as a show host, Weichselbraun has also lent her voice to Jan Dress' audio drama Letzte Tage, jetzt (Last days, now) and worked as an actress. In 2007 she played in the ORF movie  and in one episode of the Die ProSieben Märchenstunde (Frau Holle – Im Himmel ist die Hölle los). In 2009, she took the role of Sugar Kane in Peter Stones' musical Manche mögen's heiß (Some like it hot) at the Theater in der Josefstadt. 

In November 2010, she hosted Hit Giganten for Sat.1 together with the German jazz musician Roger Cicero.

Since 2011, she hosted the annual Vienna Opera Ball together with Alfons Haider and Barbara Rett for the Austrian TV broadcaster ORF.

In 2015, Weichselbraun co-hosted the Eurovision Song Contest alongside Alice Tumler and Arabella Kiesbauer in Vienna. In 2021, she hosted the second season of The Masked Singer Austria for Channel Puls 4.

Awards
Romy Awards 2006: Special Jury Prize for Dancing Stars together with Alfons Haider
2007 and 2008: Top Spot Award ORF as advertising favourite of the year
Leading Ladies Award 2008
Romy Ceremony 2008: Romy as popular talk show host
IPTV Award 2010: Viewership price for their backstage interviews Wetten, dass ..?
Romy Ceremony 2011: Romy as a popular show entertainer
Romy Awards 2012: Romy as a popular show entertainer along with Klaus Eberhartinger and diamond lapel ROMY
2015: Tyrolean of the Year

Personal life
Weichselbraun has a twin sister. Their parents married late, so each girl could choose her own surname. Melanie Binder took her father's name, while Mirjam Weichselbraun took her mother's.

After a two year-relationship Weichselbraun split up with the singer Marque. She had also been in a relationship with the Sat.1 host Jahn Hahn, but they split after four years. Since 2013 she has been in a relationship with Ben Mawson, the manager of Lana Del Rey. She has two children with him, two daughters.

Filmography

Actress

Dubbing

Presenter

References

External links 

1981 births
Living people
Actors from Innsbruck
Austrian twins
Austrian television presenters
Austrian women television presenters
ORF (broadcaster) people
Mass media people from Innsbruck
Austrian television actresses
21st-century Austrian actresses